was a province of Japan in eastern Kyūshū in the area of Ōita Prefecture. It was sometimes called , with Buzen Province. Bungo bordered Buzen, Hyūga, Higo, Chikugo, and Chikuzen Provinces.

History
At the end of the 7th century, Toyo Province was split into Buzen (literally, "the front of Toyo") and Bungo ("the back of Toyo"). Until the Heian period, Bungo was read as Toyokuni no Michi no Shiri. 

It is believed that the capital of Bungo was located in Furugō (古国府),  literally "old capital," section of the city of Ōita, but as of 2016 no archaeological evidence has been found.

The honor of the holiest Shinto shrine of Bungo Province (豊前一宮, Buzen ichinomiya) was given to Usa Shrine known as Usa Hachimangu or Usa Jingu in Usa district (today Usa, Ōita). Usa shrine had not only religious authority but also political influence to local governance, but their influence was reduced until the Sengoku period.

During the Sengoku period, in the middle of the 16th century, Bungo was a stronghold of the Ōtomo clan. The Ōuchi clan in the western Chūgoku Region was influenced to Buzen politics. In the middle of the period, both clans declined. After Toyotomi Hideyoshi also took the power in Kyūshū, 120 thousand koku of Buzen province was given to Kuroda Yoshitaka since 1587, who made Kokura, currently part of Kitakyushu, Fukuoka, his site and built the castle. Other parts of the province were divided into pieces and given to other daimyōs.

In the year 1600 the Dutch ship piloted by the Englishman Will Adams foundered on Bungo's coast. When Shogun Tokugawa Ieyasu interviewed Adams, his suspicions were confirmed that the Jesuits, who had been allowed to operate in Japan since the 1540s, were intent on gaining control of the country. When the time was right, in 1614, Ieyasu banished all Christian activity. Thus, Adams' landing in Bungo proved significant to the nation's subsequent history. This series of historic events was the basis of the 1975 book Shogun, and the 1980 miniseries of the same name.

In the Meiji period, the provinces of Japan were converted into prefectures.  Maps of Japan and Bungo Province were reformed in the 1870s.

Shrines and temples

Sasamuta-jinja and Yusuhara Hachiman-gū were the chief Shinto shrines (ichinomiya) of Bungo.

Historical districts
 Ōita Prefecture
 Amabe District (海部郡)
 Kitaamabe District (北海部郡) - dissolved
 Minamiamabe District (南海部郡) - dissolved
 Hayami District (速見郡)
 Hita District (日高郡) - dissolved
 Kusu District (球珠郡)
 Kunisaki District (国埼郡)
 Higashikunisaki District (東国東郡)
 Nishikunisaki District (西国東郡) - dissolved
 Naoiri District (直入郡) - dissolved
 Ōno District (大野郡) - dissolved
 Ōita District (大分郡) - dissolved

See also
 Kitsuki Domain 
 Mori Domain 
 Funai Domain

Notes

External links 

  Murdoch's map of provinces, 1903

Former provinces of Japan